The 1965–66 Michigan Wolverines men's basketball team represented the University of Michigan in intercollegiate college basketball during the 1965–66 season.  The team played its home games at Fielding H. Yost Field House (renamed Yost Ice Arena in 1973) on the school's campus in Ann Arbor, Michigan.  Under the direction of head coach Dave Strack, the team won the Big Ten Conference Championship.

Season review
This was the last of three consecutive Big Ten titles and NCAA Division I men's basketball tournament appearances. The team earned the Big Ten team statistical championships for both scoring offense (95.4) and scoring margin (9.9) as well as field goal percentage (48.9).  Senior Cazzie Russell averaged 30.8 points per game, including 33.2 in conference games to lead the conference. Rusell also led the conference in field goal percentage (.542).  The team was ranked in the Associated Press Top Ten Poll ten of the fifteen weeks, starting the season ranked number two and ending it ranked number nine.  The team also finished the season ranked number seven in the final UPI Coaches' Poll.  Oliver Darden served as team captain, while Russell earned team MVP.  On February 18, 1966, Craig Dill went 12 for 12 in free throw attempts against , which was a school single-game record for most without a miss until C. J. Kupec made 14 on January 2, 1975.  This surpassed Oliver Darden's total of 11 set the prior season.

Post season
In the 22-team 1966 NCAA Division I men's basketball tournament, Michigan reached the elite eight in the Mideast region by earning a bye and defeating the Western Kentucky Hilltoppers 80–79. The team then fell to the Kentucky Wildcats 84–77.

Accomplishments
Russell won the Chicago Tribune Silver Basketball as Big Ten MVP for a second year in a row.  When Russell was selected as a 1966 NCAA Men's Basketball All-American for the third year in a row it was the first three-time recognition for a Wolverine. Following the season Russell was the Number one overall player selected in the NBA Draft.  He won the numerous national player of the year awards including the Oscar Robertson Trophy, Associated Press College Basketball Player of the Year, UPI College Basketball Player of the Year, Sporting News Men's College Basketball Player of the Year and the Helms Foundation College Basketball Player of the Year.

Russell and the team set numerous Big Ten Conference records.  Russell set the following record: single-season field goals made (308 all games, broken 1981), single-season field goals made per game (13.0 conference games, broken 1969) and career field goals made (839, 1964–66, broken 1970).  In addition, the team set conference game records for single-season points per game 95.4 (broken 1969)  Also, on February 19, 1966, against , the team set conference records for single-game points (128  broken December 30, 2006) and single-game field goals made (52, broken December 19, 1972).

Russell also established numerous scoring records.  He became the first Wolverine to total 800 points in a season, surpassing his own junior season total of 694 that surpassed his sophomore season record.  This total has been surpassed by Glen Rice, but his 30.77 points per game still stands as a Michigan record.  He also surpassed Bill Buntin's career totals and career average points records with 2164 points and 27.1.  The average continues to be the school record, but Mike McGee eclipsed the total record.  Furthermore, he surpassed John Tidwell's single-game total of 43 with a 45-point effort on December 11, 1965, against  and then established the current school record of 48 on March 5, 1966, against .  Many of Russells points were scored on free throws.  He continues to hold the school's career free throw record with 486, which surpassed Buntin's 385 total but has been surpassed by the vacated 505 total of Louis Bullock. In 1966, he also set the current school single-season total record of 184, which eclipsed his own record of 152 set the prior year.  His career percentage record of 82.65 has also been surpassed by Bullock's vacated statistics (86.03%), but Lester Abram also surpassed this mark with an 82.93% in 2007.

On December 1, 1964, the team began a 17-game home winning streak against the  that continued through a January 29, 1966, victory over Wisconsin.  This surpassed the 16-game streak from February 22, 1947 – February 7, 1949, and stood as the longest home winning streak in school history until a 22-game streak that started on January 12, 1976.

Statistics
The team posted the following statistics:

Rankings

Team players drafted into the NBA
Three players from this team were selected in the NBA Draft.

See also
 1966 NCAA Division I men's basketball tournament
 NCAA Men's Division I Tournament bids by school
 NCAA Men's Division I Tournament bids by school and conference
 NCAA Division I men's basketball tournament all-time team records

References

Michigan
Michigan Wolverines men's basketball seasons
Michigan Wolverines basketball
Michigan Wolverines basketball